CPQ may refer to:

Groups and politics
 Conseil du patronat du Québec (English: Quebec Council of Employers), an institution that promotes business interests in Quebec, Canada
 Conservative Party of Quebec, a Canadian political party in the province of Quebec

Science and technology
 Camphorquinone, main ingredient in dental resin fillings
 Compaq, a defunct American technology company
 Configure Price Quote, a category of software that helps companies offer and sell complex products
 Cucurbitadienol synthase, an enzyme